Sénac is a small village located in the south of France, in the department of Hautes-Pyrénées of the region Occitanie. The INSEE code for Sénac is 65418, and the Sénac zip code is 65140.

Geography and map of Sénac 
The altitude of the city hall of Sénac is approximately 270 meters. The Sénac surface is 8.94 km ². The latitude and longitude of Sénac are 43.356 degrees North and 0.186 degrees East. Nearby cities and towns of Sénac are : Mingot (65140) at 1.91 km, Mansan (65140) at 1.94 km, Peyrun (65140) at 2.78 km, Lacassagne (65140) at 2.94 km, Montégut-Arros (32730) at 3.13 km, Saint-Sever-de-Rustan (65140) at 3.13 km, Lescurry (65140) at 3.30 km, Laméac (65140) at 4.33 km.
(The distances to these nearby towns of Sénac are calculated as the crow flies)

Population and housing of Sénac 
The population of Sénac was 215 in 1999, 239 in 2006 and 243 in 2007. The population density of Sénac is 27.18 inhabitants per km2. The number of housing of Sénac was 106 in 2007. These homes of Sénac consist of 98 main residences, 7 second or occasional homes and 1 vacant homes.

See also
Communes of the Hautes-Pyrénées department

References

Communes of Hautes-Pyrénées